Adrienne Kennaway (born 1945, New Zealand) is an illustrator and writer of children's picture books. She won the 1987 Kate Greenaway Medal from the Library Association, recognising the year's best children's book illustration by a British subject.

Information
Adrienne Prudence Moore grew up "all over the world".
She was raised partly in Kenya, a background that informed her early work, such as Game Park Holiday (1967) and The Elephant's Heart and other stories (1968), which she illustrated as Adrienne Moore. Those two 38-page picture books were written by William Lewis Radford and published by East Africa Publishing House of Nairobi in the East African Readers Library series; the Library of Congress Subject Heading is "English language—Textbooks for foreign speakers—African". The US Library of Congress catalogues twelve books she illustrated as "Adrienne Moore" from 1966 to 1972.
Kennaway became notably successful with animal folk-tales retold by Mwenye Hadithi, portraying African wildlife with vivid watercolour pictures. The first was Greedy Zebra (1984); according to one library summary: "Relates how the animals of the world, once all a dull color, acquired their furs and spots and stripes and horns, and how Zebra's greedy appetite caused him to get his particular coloring." The Greenaway Medal recognised one of those picture books, Crafty Chameleon, published by Hodder & Stoughton in 1987. The story shows how Chameleon uses craft to "gets the better of" Leopard and Crocodile.

Kennaway's later work has covered animal tales and natural history from across the world, as both illustrator and writer. She now resides in County Kerry, Ireland.

Selected works

Five of the picture books written by Mwenye Hadithi are Kennaway's five works most widely held (catalogued) in WorldCat participating libraries.

 Game Park Holiday (Nairobi: East African Publishing House, 1967), by William Lewis Radford
 The Elephant's Heart and other stories (EAPH, 1968), by Radford
 Gagg, J. C. Making This Book (Oxford: Basil Blackwell, 1978). Illustrations by Adrienne Kennaway.

By Mwenye Hadithi, illustrated by Adrienne Kennaway
Except the most recent, these picture books were published by Little, Brown (US, first edition) and Hodder & Stoughton (UK).
 Greedy zebra (1984)
 Hot hippo (1986)
 Crafty chameleon (1987)
 Tricky tortoise (1988)
 Lazy Lion (1990)
 Baby baboon (1993)
 Hungry hyena (1994)
 Laughing giraffe (London: Hodder & Stoughton, 2008) 
Related
Two more picture books with different writers were also published by Little, Brown in the US, with different publishers in the UK
 Awful aardvark (1989) 
 Curious clownfish (1990), by Eric Maddern

As writer and illustrator 

 Bushbaby (Little, Brown, 1991)
 Little elephant's walk (HarperCollins, 1992)

See also
 
 Fable

References

External links
 

 

New Zealand children's writers
New Zealand women illustrators
New Zealand children's book illustrators
New Zealand women children's writers
Kate Greenaway Medal winners
1945 births
Living people
Date of birth missing (living people)
Place of birth missing (living people)